Kirshner may refer to:

Andy Kirshner, American composer, performer, writer, and media artist
David-Seth Kirshner (born 1973), American rabbi
Don Kirshner (1934–2011), American music publisher, consultant, producer, talent manager, and songwriter
Lev Kirshner (born 1969), American soccer player and coach
Mia Kirshner (born 1975), Canadian actress, writer, and social activist
Rebecca Rand Kirshner (born 1974), American television writer and producer
Ricky Kirshner, American television producer
Robert Kirshner (born 1949), American astronomer

See also

 Kirschner
 Kirchner

Surnames

he:קירשנר